Raphael Wolf (born 6 June 1988) is a German professional football goalkeeper who currently plays for  club Fortuna Düsseldorf.

Career
In June 2017, Wolf agreed to a one-year contract with 2. Bundesliga club Fortuna Düsseldorf on a one-year contract while his contract with Bundesliga side SV Werder Bremen was set to expire at the end of the month.

Career statistics

References

1988 births
Living people
German footballers
Footballers from Munich
Association football goalkeepers
Bundesliga players
2. Bundesliga players
3. Liga players
Regionalliga players
Austrian Football Bundesliga players
Hamburger SV II players
Kapfenberger SV players
SV Werder Bremen players
SV Werder Bremen II players
Fortuna Düsseldorf players
German expatriate footballers
German expatriate sportspeople in Austria
Expatriate footballers in Austria